Matundua is a monotypic genus of South African araneomorph spiders in the family Phyxelididae containing the single species, Matundua silvatica. It was first described by Pekka T. Lehtinen in 1967, and is only found in South Africa.

See also
 List of Phyxelididae species

References

Monotypic Araneomorphae genera
Phyxelididae
Spiders of South Africa
Taxa named by Pekka T. Lehtinen